Tengan Paciencia (also named Tengan Paciencia: The Mixtape) [English: Have Patience] is the fifth compilation album by Puerto Rican reggaeton duo Jowell & Randy, released digitally in January 2010 as a prelude to their next studio album, El Momento, which was released in April 2010. The album contains 19 songs.

Track list 
"Intro"
"Tapú Tapú" (Ft. De La Ghetto)
"Caca E Vaca"
"Se Enciende El Party" (Ft. Guelo Star)
"ChocoPop" (Ft. Maicol & Manuel)
"Hasta Que Salga El Sol" (Ft. Tito "El Bambino")
"Patas De Tarantula" (Ft. De La Ghetto)
"El Cuero"  R-1 (Ft. Jowell & Randy)
"Velame El Agua" (Ft. Tony Lenta)
"Vengan Bellakas" – Maicol (Ft. Jowell & Maldy)
"Descara 2.0" – Yomo (Ft. Jowell & Randy, De La Ghetto & Guelo Star)
"Las Promesas" – Randy
"Na Na Nau" (Remix) – Cosculluela (Ft. Jowell & Randy)
"En El Pensamiento" - Cosculluela (Ft. Jowell & Randy)/La Iglesia Del Perreo - (Ft. Juno)
"Loco Contigo" – Jowell
"Luchar" – Randy "Nota Loka" (Ft. Guelo Star)
"Amor De Lejos" - Baby Rasta & Gringo (Ft. Yomo, Jowell & Randy)
"Papa Dios" - El Sujeto (Ft. Ñejo, Jowell & Randy)

Videos 
Caca E Vaca (Improvised video)
Se enciende el Party (feat. Guelo Star) (Improvised video)
El Cuero (feat. R-1)
Descara 2.0 Yomo (feat. Guelo Star, De la Ghetto, Chyno Nyno, Jowell & Randy)

2010 mixtape albums
Jowell & Randy albums
Spanish-language albums